Nicephorus Gregoras (Greek: , Nikephoros Gregoras; c. 1295 – 1360) was a Greek astronomer, historian, and theologian.

Life 
Gregoras was born at Heraclea Pontica, where he was raised and educated by his uncle, John, who was the Bishop of Heraclea. At an early age he settled at Constantinople, where his uncle introduced him to Andronicus II Palaeologus, by whom he was appointed chartophylax (keeper of the archives). In 1326 Gregoras proposed (in a treatise which remains in existence) certain reforms in the calendar, which the emperor refused to carry out for fear of disturbances; over two hundred years later they were introduced by Gregory XIII on almost the same lines.

Downfall of Andronicus II 
When Andronicus was dethroned (1328) by his grandson Andronicus III Palaeologus, Gregoras shared his downfall and retired into private life. Attacked by Barlaam of Calabria, he was with difficulty persuaded to come forward and meet him in a war of words, in which Barlaam was bested. This greatly enhanced his reputation and brought him a large number of pupils.

Gregoras remained loyal to the elder Andronicus to the last, but after his death he succeeded in gaining the favour of his grandson, by whom he was appointed to conduct the unsuccessful negotiations (for a union of the Greek and Latin churches) with the ambassadors of Pope John XXII (1333).

Hesychast controversy 
Beginning in 1346, Gregoras took an important part in the Hesychast controversy at the encouragement of the Empress Anna, by publishing a tract in which he staunchly opposed Gregorius Palamas, the chief supporter of the doctrine. Although he persuaded some prominent churchmen, such as Joseph of Ganos and Arsenios of Tyre, his opinion was opposed to those of Emperor John VI Cantacuzene. Although he presented his views at length at the synod of 1351, that synod declared his views heretical and the doctrines of Palamas orthodox. He and other dissidents were given the opportunity to recant, and he refused. He was then practically imprisoned in a monastery for two years.

Campaign against doctrine of Gregorius Palamas 
Although the doctrine of Gregorius Palamas came to be accepted by the majority of the Orthodox Church, Gregoras persisted in campaigning against what he considered a heretical doctrine forced upon the Church by a robber council. He became a monk and devoted himself to campaigning against the Palamites, destroying his friendship with John Cantacuzene. He was first placed under house arrest, then confined to the Chora Monastery. When he was released from the monastery in 1354, Gregoras returned to his preaching and denunciations. Gregoras devotes two of the 37 books of his Roman History on his objections to the doctrine of Palamas; according to Donald Nicol, "It is disappointing that Gregoras the philosopher and historian should have degenerated into a ranting polemicist in his declining years."

Writings 

Gregoras' chief work is his Byzantine History, in 37 books, covering the years 1204 to 1359. It partly supplements and partly continues the work of George Pachymeres. Gregoras shows considerable industry, but his style is pompous and affected. This work and that of John Cantacuzene supplement and correct each other, and should be read together.

The other writings of Gregoras, which (with a few exceptions) still remain unpublished, attest his great versatility. Amongst them may be mentioned a history of the dispute with Palamas; biographies of his uncle and early instructor John, metropolitan of Heraclea, and of the martyr Codratus of Antioch; funeral orations for Theodore Metochites, and the two emperors Andronicus; commentaries on the wanderings of Odysseus and on Synesius's treatise on dreams; tracts on orthography and on words of doubtful meaning; a philosophical dialogue called Phlorentius or Concerning Wisdom; astronomical treatises on the date of Easter, on  the preparation of the astrolabe and on the predictive calculation of solar eclipses; and an extensive correspondence.

Editions: in Bonn Corpus Scriptorum Historiae Byzantinae, by L. Schopen and I. Bekker, with life and list of works by J. Boivin (1829–1855); J. P. Migne, Patrologia Graeca, cxlviii., cxlix.; see also Karl Krumbacher, Geschichte der byzantinischen Litteratur (1897).

Notes

References

External links
Theodossiou, E. T., Manimanis, V. N., Dimitrijevic, M. S., & Danezis, E., The Greatest Byzantine Astronomer Nicephoros Gregoras and Serbs, Publications of the Astronomical Observatory of Belgrade, Vol. 80, p. 269-274, 2006
Greek Opera Omnia by Migne Patrologia Graeca with analytical indexes

1295 births
1360 deaths
14th-century Byzantine historians
Byzantine astronomers
Anti-Hesychasm
14th-century Byzantine scientists
14th-century Greek writers
14th-century Greek philosophers
14th-century Greek educators
14th-century Greek scientists
14th-century Greek astronomers